Rodrigo Antonio Pérez Albornoz (born 19 August 1973) is a former Chilean footballer who played as left back. His last professional club was Deportes Iquique.

Club career
Pérez began his football career at his professional hometown club O'Higgins, making his professional debut aged 19, being promoted to the first adult team by the coach Manuel Pellegrini in the 1993 season, then moving to Santiago Wanderers in 1997, after three successful seasons at Rancagua. He has spent the most time in Chile playing for Cobreloa, where he was capped in 137 matches and scored 15 goals. He also spent time with the Peruvian club Alianza Lima.

International career
He made his debut for the Chilean national squad in 1995.

Coaching career
He arrived to the mining club along with the former players Nelson Tapia and Eduardo Fournier. Next, he coached C.D. Rancagua Sur in the Tercera A, the fourth level of the Chilean football system league, from 2019 to 2020.

Honours

Club
Cobreloa
 Primera División de Chile (3): 2003 Apertura, 2003 Clausura, 2004 Clausura

Alianza Lima
 Peruvian Primera División: 2006 Descentralizado

Deportes Iquique
 Primera B: 2010
 Copa Chile: 2010

International
Chile
 Canada Cup: 1995

References

External links
 Rodrigo Pérez at Football-Lineups
 

1973 births
Living people
People from Rancagua
Chilean footballers
Chile international footballers
Chilean expatriate footballers
O'Higgins F.C. footballers
Santiago Wanderers footballers
Cobreloa footballers
C.F. Pachuca players
Club Alianza Lima footballers
Unión Española footballers
Deportes Concepción (Chile) footballers
Deportes Iquique footballers
Chilean Primera División players
Liga MX players
Peruvian Primera División players
Primera B de Chile players
Chilean expatriate sportspeople in Mexico
Chilean expatriate sportspeople in Peru
Expatriate footballers in Mexico
Expatriate footballers in Peru
1995 Copa América players
2004 Copa América players
Association football defenders
Chilean football managers
Cobreloa managers
Primera B de Chile managers